The 2020 World Sambo Championships were held in Novi Sad, Serbia from 4 to 8 November 2020.

This tournament, marking the 82nd of its kind, included 9 weight categories and three disciplines; men's and women's sambo and combat sambo. Due to the COVID-19 pandemic, only around 400 athletes from 30 countries participated this time.

Medal table

Medal overview

Sambo events

Men

Women

Combat Sambo events

References

External links 
Competition news

World Sambo Championships
World Sambo Championships, 2020
2020 in sambo (martial art)
Sports competitions in Novi Sad
International sports competitions hosted by Serbia
World Sambo Championships